George McInnes (born 10 May 1946) is a former Australian rules footballer who played for Richmond in the Victorian Football League (VFL).

A ruckman, McInnes spent three seasons at Richmond, including nine games in their premiership year of 1969. He then played in the North West Football Union with Wynyard and represented Tasmania in the 1972 Perth Carnival.

References

Holmesby, Russell and Main, Jim (2007). The Encyclopedia of AFL Footballers. 7th ed. Melbourne: Bas Publishing.
Tigerland Archive, George McInnes, April 5th, 2020

1946 births
Living people
Richmond Football Club players
Wynyard Football Club players
Australian players of Australian rules football